= Communication skill =

Communication skill or communication skills may refer to:

- Rhetoric, the facility of speakers or writers to inform, persuade, or motivate particular audiences
- Communication, the activity of conveying information through speech, writing, or other behavior
- English studies, an academic discipline that studies the English language
